is a shōjo manga series written and illustrated by Ai Yazawa. It was serialized in Ribon and later in eight volumes of graphic novels.

An OVA adaptation was produced by Shueisha and Group TAC and directed by Hiroko Tokita, with Tomoko Konparu writing the script, Yasuomi Umetsu designing the characters and Fujio Takano composing the music. The OVA covers the formation of the first student council up to the first holy festival.

Synopsis
Midori Saejima is a first-year student at the newly established Hijiri Gakuen. Midori is persuaded by her classmates to run for student council. Midori is reluctant but realizes that Akira Sudou is also running for student council, she becomes eager to win the election. Ever since Midori had seen Akira during the beginning of the school year, she had felt an intense attraction to him. Akira and Midori are elected president and vice-president respectively for the student council. Thus begins their story that centers on their relationship and the many adventures of high school with their friends.

Midori and Akira quickly become close, and Midori eagerly seeks the opportunity to become Akira's girlfriend. Although Akira seems to have similar feelings for Midori, Midori eventually finds out about Akira's feelings toward Hiroko, who is Midori's favorite art teacher at their school. Akira explains his past with Hiroko and how he considers her to be an important person in his life. Midori is somewhat comforted by Akira's honesty and his explanation that his relationship with Hiroko is strictly platonic. Akira eventually comes to reciprocate Midori's feelings.

However, their relationship is troubled by Midori's increasing jealousy toward Hiroko and Akira's strong connection. They break up after months of awkwardness. Midori finds comfort in her long-time friend Ken Nakagawa, who has secretly loved Midori for years. Once Akira abruptly leaves the country to find Masashi Sakamoto, Hiroko's lover and Akira's half-brother, Midori realizes that she cannot be with anyone except Akira.

Midori and Akira rekindle their relationship after Akira comes back. The story ends with their graduation from high school.

Characters

The protagonist of the story.  She is always happy and has many friends at school. Likes to draw and sing. She falls in love with Akira.

A main character in the story. The guy who Midori falls in love with. He has a troubled past with an unhappy childhood, but eventually opens up to Midori. He always wears the ducktail hairstyle, and we can rarely see him without it.

Midori's friend from junior-high. Ken is a musician who dreams of becoming a star. He first appears in volume 3, when Midori meets up with some of her old friends on her birthday.  He is often mentioned in another of Yazawa's works, Gokinjo Monogatari, as the character Tsutomu bears an uncanny resemblance to him.

The secretary of the student council. He is from class D.

A student of class A. She is calm and takes pride in her soft skin.

Art teacher at Midori's school. She is popular among her students due to her beauty and kind personality. She is in a long-distance relationship with Masashi Sakamoto. Not seeing the love of her life makes her reach her limit but the couple finally gets married in the 4th volume.

Akira's tutor before high school. An avid artist, he leaves Hiroko in Japan and travels around the world (mostly France) for his art. It is revealed in the story that Masashi is Akira's half-brother.

She joined student council and was elected secretary with Bunta Kouno. She became Midori's best friend. She longs to be Shuuichi's girlfriend ever since they went to junior high together. At first glance she looks like a stuck up or cold person because of her attitude. But she really is nice. Midori likes to call her "Mamirin". The nickname sounds like "Marilyn" because Mamiya is pretty and has mole that looks like Marilyn Monroe's.

He joined the student council at the beginning of the manga and was elected treasurer. He became Akira's best friend. He is very popular among the girls in his school because of his good looks.

She was Shuuichi's girlfriend and Mamiya's rival. She's a very cute girl, seen as an idol by the boys in Hijiri. She is jealous of Mamiya and doubts about Shuuchi's fidelity. This will cause them to break up.

External links
 

1991 manga
1994 anime OVAs
Ai Yazawa
Group TAC
Shōjo manga
Shueisha franchises
Shueisha manga